"Funkorama" is a song by American rapper Redman. It was released on December 19, 1995 via Interscope Records as the first single from The Erick Sermon Compilation Album Insomnia. Written and produced by Redman, it samples "Midnight" by A Tribe Called Quest and "Stick 'Em" by The Fat Boys. The single peaked at number 81 on the Billboard Hot 100 in the United States. Black-and-white music video starring Redman also featured cameos from Def Squad, Method Man, Treach, Q-Tip and other fellow rappers.

Track listing

Charts

References

External links

1995 singles
Redman (rapper) songs
Song recordings produced by Erick Sermon
Interscope Records singles
Black-and-white music videos
1995 songs
Songs written by Ali Shaheed Muhammad
Songs written by Phife Dawg
Songs written by Q-Tip (musician)
Songs written by Redman (rapper)